2010 Icelandic Men's Football League Cup was the 15th season of the Icelandic Men's League Cup, a pre-season professional football competition in Iceland. The competition started on 20 February 2010 and concluded on 1 May 2010. KR Reykjavík beat Breiðablik 2–1 in the final and won their fourth League Cup title.

The 24 teams were divided into 3 groups of 8 teams. Every team played every other team of its group once, either home or away. Top 2 teams from each group and the two best third-placed qualified for the quarter-finals.

Group stage
The games were played from 20 February to 18 April 2010.

Group 1

Group 2

Group 3

Knockout stage
Source: ksi.is

Quarterfinals
The games were played on 22 April 2010.

Semifinals
The games were played on 25 April 2010.

Final

External links
Icelandic FA

Deildabikar
Deildabikar
Icelandic Men's Football League Cup